Live at the Apollo was a concert by Ben Harper and The Blind Boys of Alabama filmed at the Apollo Theater (Harlem, New York), on October 12, 2004 and released as a DVD and a CD.

The DVD was released on March 29, 2005 and the CD on March 14, 2005.

CD Material
The songs on the CD are the same as those on the DVD, which are listed below.

DVD material
Concert songs
 "11th Commandment" 
 "Well, Well, Well"
 "I Want To Be Ready"
 "Take My Hand"
 "Picture of Jesus"
 "Church House Steps"
 "Give a Man a Home"
 "Wicked Man"
 "Mother Pray"
 "I Shall Not Walk Alone"
 "Church On Time"
 "Where Could I Go"
 "There Will Be a Light"
 "Satisfied Mind"

Approximate concert time: 1:17:00

Making of the Album 
(Approximate run time: 9:36)

Behind the Scenes
(Approximate run time: 14:38)

Photo Slideshow
(Approximate run time: 1:30)

DVD total approximate run time: 1:45:00

Ben Harper albums
The Blind Boys of Alabama albums
Collaborative albums
2005 video albums
Live video albums
2005 live albums
Virgin Records live albums
Virgin Records video albums
Albums recorded at the Apollo Theater

hu:Live at the Apollo